Catherine Wilhelmina Vautier  (27 August 1902 – 12 June 1989) was a notable New Zealand netball player, teacher and sports administrator. She was born in Palmerston North, New Zealand, in 1902.

In the 1977 Queen's Silver Jubilee and Birthday Honours, Vautier was appointed an Officer of the Order of the British Empire, for services to sport and the community.

References

1902 births
1989 deaths
New Zealand netball players
Sportspeople from Palmerston North
New Zealand sports executives and administrators
New Zealand Officers of the Order of the British Empire